Bowditch is a lunar impact crater that lies on the far side of the Moon, just beyond the eastern limb. It is located on a region of the lunar surface that is brought into view due to libration, but at such times the area is viewed from the edge and so not much detail can be observed. It lies just to the north of the small Lacus Solitudinis lunar mare, between the craters  Titius to the southwest and Perel'man to the east-northeast.

The rim of this crater is open to the southwest and the crater is elongated to the northeast, possibly due to a merged crater. The outer rim varies in height, with the most prominent sections being the southwest face and a ridge mount to the northwest. The interior floor has been flooded with basaltic lava, an unusual feature for a crater on the far side. The interior floor is generally flat, and marked by a number of small craters. However, there are some low ridges in the surface that are concentric with the inner wall. A formation of irregular ridges occupies most of the rim gap along the southwest.

Bowditch is described in the Apollo 15 Preliminary Science Report, along with Lacus Solitudinis to the south, as a significant volcanic feature:
On the southwest wall of the oblong crater (Bowditch) is a distinct "strand line," marking the highest level reached by lava before cooling and withdrawal. A faint trace of this line exists in other parts of the wall. A prominent terrace (around all except the southern part of the outer edges of the floor) marks another state in the subsidence of the lava.

Nearby craters

Near the southern rim of this formation, at the northern edge of the Lacus Solitudinus, are four tiny craters that have been assigned individual names by the IAU. These are listed below.

Satellite craters
By convention these features are identified on lunar maps by placing the letter on the side of the crater midpoint that is closest to Bowditch.

References

External links

 AS15-P-9960 Apollo 15 Panoramic camera view of Bowditch
 LTO-100C1 Titius — L&PI topographic map
 100C1S1(50) Siegfried — L&PI topographic map

Impact craters on the Moon